The 2018–19 Algerian Women's League Cup is the 3rd season of the Algerian Women's League Cup. The competition is open to all Algerian Women's clubs participating in the Algerian Women's Championship. FC Constantine wins the cup beating AS Sûreté Nationale in the final match played in Omar Hamadi Stadium, Algiers.

Round of 16
The first round of the cup was played on 6 October 2018.

Quarter-finals
The quarter finals were played on 5 February 2019.

Semi-finals
The semi finals were played on 19 February 2019.

Final
The final was played on 7 March 2019.

References

Algerian Women's League Cup